Exerodonta smaragdina (commonly known as the emerald tree frog) is a species of frog in the family Hylidae. It is endemic to Mexico.

Distribution and habitat
Its natural habitats are subtropical or tropical dry forests, subtropical or tropical moist montane forests, rivers, freshwater marshes, and intermittent freshwater marshes. It is threatened by habitat loss.

References

Exerodonta
Amphibians described in 1940
Taxonomy articles created by Polbot